Motorcycles is a 1949 Czech drama film directed by Martin Frič.

Cast
 František Hanus as Martin Baresch
 Bela Jurdová as Mana Kolarschowa
 Felix Le Breux as Ing. Rokosch
 Vilém Pfeiffer as Kerman
 Robert Vrchota as Tomek

References

External links
 

1949 films
1949 drama films
1940s Czech-language films
Czechoslovak black-and-white films
Films directed by Martin Frič
Czechoslovak drama films
1940s Czech films